During the 2006–07 English football season, Watford competed in the FA Premier League, after being promoted from the Football League Championship last season.

Season summary
Watford were involved in the setting of several Premier League records during the season: when Tottenham Hotspur keeper Paul Robinson accidentally scored for Spurs from a long free-kick that bounced over Ben Foster's head, he became only the third keeper to score in the Premier League (the other two being Peter Schmeichel and Brad Friedel); and when Alec Chamberlain (born in 1964) came on a substitute in a Premier League match, he became the oldest player to appear in the Premier League. Watford were relegated after only one season in the top-flight.

Final league table

Results
Watford's score comes first

Legend

FA Premier League

FA Cup

League Cup

Players

First-team squad
Squad at end of season

Left club during season

Transfers

In
  Chris Powell –  Charlton Athletic, 30 June, free
  Damien Francis –  Wigan Athletic, 12 July, £1,500,000
  Danny Shittu –  Queens Park Rangers, 6 August, £1,600,000 (rising to £3,000,000)
  Tamás Priskin –  Győr, 9 August, undisclosed
  Ben Foster –  Manchester United, 10 August, season-long loan
  Albert Jarrett –  Brighton & Hove Albion, 16 August, free
  Tommy Smith –  Derby County, 30 August, £500,000
  Moses Ashikodi –  Rangers, 1 January, nominal fee
  Will Hoskins and  Lee Williamson –  Rotherham United, 5 January, £1,000,000 (joint transfer fee)
  Steve Kabba –  Sheffield United, 26 January, £500,000
  Gareth Williams –  Leicester City, 31 January, £600,000
  Johan Cavalli –  Istres, 31 January, free
  Cédric Avinel –  Créteil, 31 January, free
  Douglas Rinaldi –  Veranópolis, 31 January, six-month loan

Out
  Ashley Young –  Aston Villa, 23 January, £8,000,000 (rising to £9,650,000)
  Matthew Spring –  Luton Town, 18 January, £200,000 (rising to £300,000)
  Claude Seanla –  Kettering Town
  Sheku Kamara – released
  Francino Francis –  Redditch United, free
  Les Ferdinand – retired
  Joe O'Cearuill –  Arsenal, free

Transfers in:  >£5,700,000 (rising to >£7,100,000)
Transfers out:  >£8,200,000 (rising to >£9,950,000)

Statistics

Appearances and goals

|-
! colspan=14 style=background:#dcdcdc; text-align:center| Goalkeepers

|-
! colspan=14 style=background:#dcdcdc; text-align:center| Defenders

|-
! colspan=14 style=background:#dcdcdc; text-align:center| Midfielders

|-
! colspan=14 style=background:#dcdcdc; text-align:center| Forwards

|-
! colspan=14 style=background:#dcdcdc; text-align:center| Players transferred out during the season

References

Notes

Watford F.C. seasons
Watford